Mohsen Jafari Rad (November 1, 1986 - January 18, 2022) from Rudsar was a journalist, film writer, critic, film director and documentary maker.
Most of his activities were carried out in the film magazine from 2006 to 2018. Mohsen Jafari Rad started filmmaking in 2007 from Lahijan Youth Cinema Association. He was simultaneously active as a reporter, journalist and critic in the fields of sociology, cinema and literature. . Cooperation with more than twenty general and specialized publications, including Hamshahri, Sharq, Etemad, Jam Jam, Farhikhtegan, Gilan Moroz, Hamdali, Navavaran, Saba, Cinema; And specialized monthly and weekly magazines such as Film, Experience, Chalcheragh, etc. are among these activities. He started making short fiction and documentary films since 2007 and collaborated with the Iranian Youth Cinema Association, Lahijan, Rasht, Chalus offices, the Center for the Development of Documentary and Experimental Cinema, the Documentary House. Making the documentaries "Suffering under the Skin", "Green Shadows" Among his other activities are the documentary series "One of Us" and the short fiction film "Only Meh is Real" produced by Rambad Javan. Mohsen Jafari Rad also taught cinema in colleges and private institutions and the Iranian Youth Cinema Association.

References 

Iranian comedians
People from Tehran
Iranian male singers
Musicians from Tehran
Iranian film directors
Iranian male film actors
Iranian male stage actors
Iranian stand-up comedians
Iranian television directors
Iranian male television actors
2022 deaths
Deaths by person in Iran
Victims of police brutality
1986 births